Labigastera nitidula is a European and North African species of fly in the family Tachinidae.

References

Phasiinae
Diptera of Europe
Diptera of Africa
Insects described in 1824